Independence Methodist Church is a historic Methodist church located at the junction of N500E and E375N southeast of Wheatfield in Gillam Township, Jasper County, Indiana. It was built in 1872, and is a one-story, simple rectangular frame building originally built in the Greek Revival style. It was later modified with Gothic Revival style lancet windows and Italianate style trim on the central belfry.

It was added to the National Register of Historic Places on March 5, 1982.

See also
National Register of Historic Places listings in Jasper County, Indiana

References

Methodist churches in Indiana
Churches on the National Register of Historic Places in Indiana
Greek Revival architecture in Indiana
Gothic Revival architecture in Indiana
Italianate architecture in Indiana
Churches completed in 1872
Churches in Jasper County, Indiana
National Register of Historic Places in Jasper County, Indiana
Italianate church buildings in the United States